Philippe Berta (born 11 April 1960) is a French geneticist and politician of the Democratic Movement (MoDem) who has been serving as member of the French National Assembly since 18 June 2017, representing the department of Gard.

Political career
In parliament, Merta serves as member of the Committee on Cultural Affairs and Education. Amid the COVID-19 pandemic in France, he was appointed to chair a parliamentary working group on research into the virus.

In addition to his committee assignments, Merta is a member of the French-Swiss Parliamentary Friendship Group.

See also
 2017 French legislative election

References

1960 births
Living people
Deputies of the 15th National Assembly of the French Fifth Republic
La République En Marche! politicians

21st-century French politicians
Politicians from Besançon
Physicians from Besançon
Deputies of the 16th National Assembly of the French Fifth Republic